Bruce Alexander Montague (24 March 1939 – 16 August 2022) was a British actor, best known for his role as Leonard Dunn in the television sitcom Butterflies. He also acted in over 300 television productions – one of his earliest being in the 1965 sci-fi drama Undermind. In 2000, he guest-starred in the Doctor Who audio adventure The Genocide Machine and, in the following year, he starred alongside Paul McGann in the Doctor Who story Sword of Orion. In 2015, he appeared as a guest role in Hollyoaks as Derek Clough.

Life and career 
Montague played Mr. Brownlow in Oliver! directed by Sam Mendes at the London Palladium for 3 years. He played in Phantom of the Opera directed by Hal Prince at Her Majesty's Theatre for 2 years. He starred as Abner Dillon in a UK tour of 42nd Street. He would later reprise his role in the 2017 West End revival. He guest-starred in "Wild Justice", a 2013 episode of New Tricks. In that episode was Nicholas Lyndhurst, one of his fellow cast members from Butterflies.

In 2015, he starred in Casa Valentina by Harvey Fierstein. In October 2019, he appeared in an episode of Doctors alongside former Butterflies co-star Wendy Craig.

Personal life 
Montague lived in Hove with his wife, actress and novelist, Barbara Latham. They were married from 1962 until her death in April 2022, and had three children.

Montague died from cancer on 16 August 2022, at the age of 83.

Filmography

References

External links 
 
 
 A profile of Bruce Montague
 

1939 births
2022 deaths
20th-century English male actors
21st-century English male actors
Alumni of RADA
Deaths from cancer in England
English male stage actors
English male television actors
English musical theatre actors
Male actors from Kent
People from Deal, Kent
People from Hove